Finch is a fantasy novel by American writer Jeff VanderMeer, his third set in the Ambergris universe. Written in the noir style of detective novels, it stands alone, while referencing characters and events from the earlier City of Saints and Madmen and Shriek: An Afterword.

Plot
At the time of Finch, Ambergris is ruled by the gray caps, a non-human, "spore-based" species. Their "Rising" followed a destructive civil war between rival human factions.

The title character, reluctant detective John Finch, is tasked with investigating a double-murder, one victim a human and the second a gray cap.

Reception
Eric Brown reviewed the book for The Guardian and says that "Finch plays with the conventions of the noir thriller, espionage and fantasy genres, mixing all three to produce something unique and unsettling." He does suggest that the "fractured, fragmented prose style ... is likely to alienate as many readers as it charms" but concludes that the book is "a compelling experience, a fungalpunk nightmare pullulating with dark, phantasmagorical transformations: it works equally as a stylish detective story, a perverse example of the New Weird fantasy subgenre, and an effective metaphor for the dehumanising effects of occupying forces and totalitarian regimes."

Awards and honors
The novel was a nominee for the 2010 World Fantasy Award for Best Novel.

References

External links
 Finch at Google Books

2009 American novels
American fantasy novels
Fictional fungi